{{infobox writer
| name             = José Joaquín Palmá Lasso
| image            = JoseJoaquinPalma.jpg
| caption          = Palma in 1875
| birth_date       = 
| birth_place      = Bayamo, Cuba
| death_date       = 
| death_place      = Guatemala City, Guatemala
| pseudonym        = Cantor de la Patria
| spouse           = Leonela del Castillo
| children         = José Joaquín, Carlos, Zoila América Ana Palma del Castillo
| occupation       = diplomat, professor, journalist, poet
| notableworks     = Tinieblas del AlmaPoesíasLetra del Himno Nacional de Guatemala
| signature        = palmafirma.jpg
| awards           = * Medalla de Oro de Primera Clase de Honduras
 Medalla de Oro de Guatemala (1911)
 Hijo Predilecto de Bayamo (1951, póstumo)
 Mayor General del Ejército cubano (1951, póstumo)
| firma            = 
| web              = 
}}

José Joaquín Palma Lasso (September 11, 1844 – August 2, 1911) was a Cuban writer who was the author of the Guatemalan national anthem's lyrics.

Biography
He was the son of Pedro Palma y Aguilera and Dolores Lasso de la Vega and went to "San José" School in Bayamo under the direction of José María Izaguirre whom he would later meet again in Guatemala. He wrote poetry since his youth and is considered an important Cuban poet.

He joined the revolutionaries of the Ten Years' War in Cuba (1868–1878) and served briefly as a recruiter for the revolutionary forces and as an aid to Carlos Manuel de Céspedes, the leader of the insurrection. When Bayamo was about to fall to the Spanish forces, he set fire to his own house in the citywide fire started by the residents.

He went to Jamaica, New York City and Guatemala in an attempt to gain support for the Cuban insurrection. In Guatemala he met the Honduran Marco Aurelio Soto and his cousin Ramón Rosa who in 1876 -with the help of Guatemalan president Justo Rufino Barrios became president and Prime Minister of Honduras, respectively. He went to Honduras as private secretary to President Soto in 1876 and left this county and returned to Guatemala when Soto resigned as president, forced by his former ally, Justo Rufino Barrios.

Not until 14 years later, in 1910, did he reveal that he was the author.  He received a gold medal from the Guatemalan government for his literary and patriotic contributions.

By the end of the 1890s, Palma had developed a strong friendship with public speaker and journalist Rafael Spinola, editor in chief of La Ilustración Guatemalteca and also secretary of Infrastructure of president Manuel Estrada Cabrera; by 1899, Mexican writer and diplomat Federico Gamboa arrived to Guatemala as interim Mexican Ambassador and got to know both Spinola and Palma quite well.

 National Anthem of Guatemala 

In 1896 the Guatemalan president José María Reina Barrios promoted a contest to select the lyrics of the national anthem - the National Anthem of Guatemala. The winning piece was entered anonymously and won by unanimous decision; Palma was part of the jury that selected the winner lyrics.

In the 1900s, it was frequent that he wrote contributions for the Albumes de Minerva, official proceedings magazine of the Fiestas Minervalias, main propaganda event of president Estrada Cabrera.  However, the author of the lyrics of the National Anthem was still in the dark; between 1896 and 1910, Guatemalans were intrigued about the anonymous contributor that won the contest in 1897; but the enigma was over when Palma Lasso -already in his death bed- confessed that he was the famous «Anónymous»; he had not signed with his name given that he was part of the jury in 1897. In the 1910 Fiestas Minervalias the government awarded him with a prize and on 23 July 1911, Guatemalan intellectuals and president Manuel Estrada Cabrera, crown him with a silver laurel crown in his residence.

 Death 

By early August 1911, Palm was agonizing; his children took care of him until the very last moment -especially Zoila América Ana, who has his inseparable companion- and died at his home on 2 August 1911.  A large crowd came to present the respects and to say goodbye to the poet; his remains were covered with the Cuban flag -given that he was the Cuban consul at the time of his death-. His funeral took place at 10:00 am on 3 August; doctor Luis Toledo Herrarte pronounced a speech in representation of the government and Arturo Ubico Urruela, president of Congress, spoke about the terrible loss and how his adoptive country had loved the poet very much. Finally, Rafael Arévalo Martínez wrote a poem in his honor.

 Monuments and ceremonies in his honor 

 Theater "José Joaquin Palma", Calle "Carlos Manuel de Céspedes" #172 e/ Perucho Figueredo y Lora, Bayamo, Cuba was named in his honor.
 On 2 September 1944, general Federico Ponce Vaides, then interim president of Guatemala, issued an extraordinary decree to celebrate Palma's Centennial, however, the political situation Guatemala was going through at the time -after the resignation of general Jorge Ubico- did not permit the ceremonies to go as planned.  On 11 September 1944, only the Universidad Nacional held a ceremony in their building, by invitation of doctor Carlos Federico Mora, president of the University.  Doctor Calixto García, business attaché of Cuba in Guatemala, was the guest of honor, David Vela gave the ceremonial speech and José Joaquín Palma, grandson of the poet spoke on his behalf. Then, on the house #27 on the 10 E. street, where Palma died in 1911, both Cuban and Guatemalan national anthems were played and a commemorative plaques was unveiled.
 Carlos Prío Socarrás government in Cuba declared the house where Palma Lasso was born as a Cuban National Monument in 1951.

 Return of his remains to Cuba 

In 1951, Cuban president Carlos Prío Socarrás requested Guatemalan president Jacobo Árbenz the return of Palma's remains to Cuba; upon learning that Palma's family agreed to this, Árbenz asked his Secretary of Foreign Affairs and Secretary of Education to take care of the ceremonies.

On 16 April 1951, after his remains were incinerated in presence of his family, Cuban Ambassador and a commission of the Guatemalan government, the urn was placed on an artillery cart of the Guatemalan Army and taken to Congress, where it remained for 24 hours, while it had a Guard of Honor of the President and his cabinet, representative to Congress, diplomats, Army cadets, school delegations, teachers, member of the Guatemalan Society of Geography and History, journalist and intellectuals. Doctor Raúl Roa Garcia, director of Culture the Cuban government, made the ceremonial speech and a student choral group sang the anthems of Cuba and Guatemala, and, for the first time, the Hymn to "José Joaquín Palma"'', composed by Raúl Marchena. To end the ceremony, a bronze plaque with the signatures of Palma Lasso and Rafael Alrez Ovalle – who composed the music the Guatemalan Anthem – was unveiled.

The next day, 17 April, in a ceremony in Congress, colonel Alfredo Lima and doctor Aureliano Sánchez Arango, pronounce a eulogy of Palma Lasso, and stressed the love that he had for his adoptive country, Guatemala. Zoila América Ana Palma de Figueroa, daughter of the poet was in attendance for this ceremony, which ended with a speech by representative Marco Antonio Villamar Contreras, who bid farewell to Palma in the name of the people of Guatemala. Immediately after, his remains were lifted by the Secretaries of Education of both Cuba and Guatemala, doctor Sánchez Arango and Héctor Morgan García, respectively and by the President of Congress and the Secretary of Foreign Affairs of Guatemala, Manuel Galich and the general public sang the original Guatemalan Anthem lyrics as they were written by Palma; then, the urn was placed on a military jeep and transported to La Aurora International Airport escorted by Army Cadets.

Once at the cemetery, Morgan García, officially gave the remains to the Cuban delegation. At 1:15 pm, five Cuban airplanes took off back to Cuba, and were escorted by a Guatemalan plane formation to the Atlantic coast.

Cuban president Carlos Prío Socarrás, his cabinet, diplomats, military commanders, journalist, school children, teachers and other guests received Palma's urn at the Rancho Boyeros military airport.  Thousand of children with both Guatemala and Cuba flags walked alongside the urn until it was placed in the Hall of the Lost Steps and the government declared national mourning on 17 and 18 April.  Palma was awarded the titles of "Bayamo's best son" and "Major general of the Cuban Army".

Notes and references

Notes

References

Bibliography

Works of Palma Lasso 

 
 

1844 births
1911 deaths
19th-century Cuban poets
Cuban male poets
People from Bayamo
National anthem writers
19th-century male writers